Israel Doniach FRCP (9 March 1911 – 11 February 2001) was a British physician, pathologist and an expert on the causes and diagnosis of thyroid cancers. He was the first to show that radioactive iodine, which had been used for the diagnosis and treatment of patients with various types of thyroid disease, could itself be carcinogenic to the thyroid gland.

Family
His wife was clinical immunologist Deborah Doniach (1912-2004). They had two children, Sebastian, a physicist, and Vera (1936-1958).

References

External links
 The Doniach Lecture

1911 births
2001 deaths
English pathologists